In Colorado, State Highway 138 may refer to:
U.S. Route 138 in Colorado, the only Colorado highway numbered 138 since 1968
Colorado State Highway 138 (pre-1953) northwest of Denver